The 2020–21 season was Akwa United's 25th season in the Nigerian football league system and their 12th (non-consecutive) season in the top tier of Nigerian football.

During the season, Akwa United participated in the Nigeria Professional Football League for the ninth consecutive season and the Nigeria FA Cup.

They began their Nigeria Professional Football League campaign with a home tie against city rivals Dakkada, which ended goalless. On 1 August 2021, they beat MFM 5-2 at Godswill Akpabio Stadium to seal the league title. It was their first-ever top-flight triumph. They suffered an early exit from the Aiteo Cup, losing 1-0 to Gateway United in the First Round.

Kit and sponsorship
Supplier: Owu Sportswear

Competitions

Overview

Nigeria Professional Football League

League table

Results summary

Matches
On 9 November 2020, the fixtures for the forthcoming season were announced.

Nigeria FA Cup

Akwa United were Akwa Ibom State's sole representative in the Aiteo Cup. The Uyo club suffered an early exit from the competition, as they lost to Gateway United 1-0 at the FIFA Goal Project Pitch. Ilechukwu Julius scored the only goal of the game.

Transfers

In

Total spending:

Out

Total incoming:

References 

Akwa United F.C.